Joaquim Manuel Sampaio da Silva  (born 13 November 1975), known as Quim, is a Portuguese former footballer who played as a goalkeeper.

He appeared in 396 Primeira Liga matches during his professional career, over 12 seasons with Braga, six with Benfica and one with Aves, and won five major titles with the second club.

Quim represented Portugal at the 2006 World Cup and in two European Championships, earning 32 caps.

Club career

Braga
Born in Vila Nova de Famalicão, Braga District, Quim started his career at S.C. Braga.

He played his first game in the Primeira Liga during the 1994–95 season, becoming the club's first-choice shortly after.

Benfica
On 7 July 2004, Quim joined S.L. Benfica on a five-year contract, sharing the goal with José Moreira in the title-winning 2004–05. He began the following campaign as starter, but injury to him as well as Moreira saw Marcelo Moretto being signed during the winter break, controversially earning a place in the starting eleven.

Quim's fortunes turned around at the beginning of 2006–07, as new coach Fernando Santos announced that he would be his main goalkeeper. Subsequently, the player rarely put in a bad performance since regaining first-choice status, even when the manager was dismissed early into the next season.

In 2008–09, with Benfica retaining the same three goalkeepers under Quique Sánchez Flores, Quim started the campaign, lost the job to Moreira in between, was even demoted to third-string (with Moretto starting in the Taça da Liga) and finished again as starter, with the team eventually ranking third. He also took the field in the final of the latter competition, and saved three penalty shoot-out attempts against Sporting CP for the win.

Braga return
In the 2009–10 season, Quim played all the matches and minutes as Benfica won the league for the first time in five years, adding to this the honour of conceding the least goals (20). At the end of June 2010, however, the 34-year-old was released, returning to first professional club Braga on a three-year deal, but spent his first year on the sidelines nursing an achilles tendon injury.

Quim returned as first choice for 2011–12, helping Braga to the third place with the subsequent qualification for the UEFA Champions League. However, after the arrival of Beto from FC Porto the following campaign, he made only six competitive appearances in its first part, including once in the league against S.C. Beira-Mar and the 1–2 Champions League home loss to Galatasaray SK.

After Beto left for Sevilla FC in January 2013 Quim was reinstated as the starter, one of his first appearances being a 0–0 home draw with his former side Benfica in the League Cup semi-finals, won in a penalty shootout. Manager José Peseiro also selected him for the competition's decider against Porto, where a penalty by Alan signified the game's only goal and Braga's first trophy win in 47 years.

Later years
In May 2013, Quim announced he would not renew his contract and subsequently retire after 19 years as a professional; he played his last match on the 11th against C.D. Nacional, a 1–3 home loss for his 382nd game in the Portuguese top division. However, two months later, he went back on his decision and signed for C.D. Aves in the Segunda Liga.

On 17 May 2016, Quim renewed his contract for another year. He was still first-choice in 2016–17, when his team returned to the top flight after ten years.

In the following season, Quim faced stiff competition from newly-signed Adriano Facchini in the league, but the 42-year-old started in the club's victorious run in the Taça de Portugal, which marked its first major conquest in 87 years of history. He remained connected to Aves after his retirement, as director of Institutional Relations.

Quim worked as a goalkeeper coach subsequently, at Aves, Rio Ave FC, F.C. Tirsense and C.D. Trofense.

International career
After representing his country at every level from the under-16s upwards, and winning the UEFA European Under-19 Championship (then under-18) in 1994, Quim made his senior debut in August 1999 in a 4–0 victory over Andorra, after which he was Portugal's third-choice at UEFA Euro 2000, enjoying a short cameo as a substitute in the 3–0 win against Germany in the group stage's final round before establishing himself as number one in the 2002 FIFA World Cup qualifying campaign. However, a failed drug test saw him miss out on the competition held in South Korea and Japan.

Quim was a backup for the national side during both Euro 2004 and the 2006 World Cup, behind the habitual Ricardo. He was originally named in the squad for Euro 2008 but suffered a wrist injury the day before their first game, ruling him out of the tournament – he was replaced by Porto's Nuno.

Quim started the 2010 World Cup qualifying campaign as first-choice, but lost his place midway through it to another Braga player, Eduardo, as Portugal eventually qualified. After being league champion for Benfica, he would be left out of the squad for the final stages in South Africa.

Career statistics

Club

International

Honours
Benfica
Primeira Liga: 2004–05, 2009–10
Supertaça Cândido de Oliveira: 2005
Taça da Liga: 2008–09, 2009–10
Taça de Portugal runner-up: 2004–05

Braga
Taça da Liga: 2012–13
Taça de Portugal runner-up: 1997–98
Supertaça Cândido de Oliveira runner-up: 1998

Aves
Taça de Portugal: 2017–18

Portugal
UEFA European Championship runner-up: 2004
UEFA European Under-19 Championship: 1994

Individual
Segunda Liga Best Goalkeeper: 2013–14, 2014–15

Orders
 Medal of Merit, Order of the Immaculate Conception of Vila Viçosa (House of Braganza)

See also
List of sportspeople sanctioned for doping offences

References

External links

1975 births
Living people
People from Vila Nova de Famalicão
Sportspeople from Braga District
Portuguese footballers
Association football goalkeepers
Primeira Liga players
Liga Portugal 2 players
S.C. Braga players
S.L. Benfica footballers
C.D. Aves players
Portugal youth international footballers
Portugal under-21 international footballers
Portugal international footballers
UEFA Euro 2000 players
UEFA Euro 2004 players
2006 FIFA World Cup players
Portuguese sportspeople in doping cases
Doping cases in association football
Association football goalkeeping coaches